Letters to Family, Friends, and Editors is a book collecting some of Franz Kafka's letters from 1900 to 1924. The majority of the letters in the volume are addressed to Max Brod. Originally published in Germany in 1959 as Briefe 1902-1924, the collection was first published in English by Schocken Books in 1977. It was translated by Richard and Clara Winston.

Correspondents

Family
 Julie and Hermann Kafka - parents
 Elli Hermann, née Kafka - sister
 Valli Pollak, née Kafka - sister
 Ottla Davidová, née Kafka - sister
 Josef David - Ottla's husband
 Siegfried Löwy - uncle

Other letters to the family are collected in Letters to Ottla

Kafka's long, undelivered Letter to His Father was published separately. It also appears in Dearest Father and The Sons.

Friends
 Oskar Pollak - Childhood friend and art historian; a 1902 letter to him includes Kafka's oldest surviving work of fiction - "Shamefaced Lanky and Impure in Heart"
 Max Brod - Closest friend; writer and Kafka's literary executor
 Elsa Brod, née Taussig - Brod's wife
 Sophie Friedmann, née Brod - Brod's sister
 Emmy Salveter - Max Brod's friend and possible lover
 Felix Weltsch - Classmate; philosopher and Zionist
 Lise Kaznelson, née Weltsch - Weltsch's cousin
 Irma Weltsch - Weltsch's wife
 Oskar Baum - Author, music teacher, and organist
 Leo Baum - Baum's son
 Robert Klopstock - Close friend, stayed with Kafka through his illness

Romantic Interests
 Selma Kohn Robitschek
 Hedwig W. - a letter from 1907 includes a poem Kafka claims he wrote "years ago."
 Minze Eisner
 Tile Rössler

The letters to Milena Jesenská and Felice Bauer are collected in respective volumes. Letters to Felice also includes Kafka's letters to Grete Bloch.

Publishers, Writers and Artists
 Ernst Rowohlt - Publisher
 Willy Haas - Prague-born writer and journalist, editor of Herder-Blätter magazine
 Otto Stoessl - Austrian writer
 Kurt Wolff - Publisher
 Martin Buber - Philosopher and religious writer
 Robert Musil (debatable) - Writer
 Alfred Kubin - Graphic artist and illustrator
 René Schickele - Alsatian writer and pacifist; editor of Die Weissen Blätter during the war years.
 Ernst Feigl - Prague-born poet and writer
 Gottfried Kölwel - Poet
 Josef Körner - Literary historian and critic
 Johannes Urzidil - Prague-born writer and journalist, managing editor of Der Mensch
 Julie Wohryzek's sister (unnamed) - Sister of Kafka's former fiancée
 Carl Seelig - Writer, critic, and editor (e.g. Robert Walser)

Casual Acquaintances
 Director Eisner - Department head at Assicurazioni Generali, where Kafka worked
 Gertrud Thieberger - Sister of Kafka's Hebrew teacher, future wife of Johannes Urzidil
 Yitzhak Löwy - Actor
 Ludwig Hardt - Reciting artist, included some of Kafka's writing in his work
 Hugo Bergmann - Former classmate; Philosopher and Zionist
 Else Bergmann - Hugo Bergmann's wife

Conversation Slips
Both German and English editions of the book include a selection from the slips of paper Kafka used to communicate during the last few weeks of his life, when he was advised not to speak.

References

Kafka, Franz. Letters to Family, Friends, and Editors. New York City: Schocken Books, 1977. 

Essays by Franz Kafka
1959 non-fiction books
Collections of letters
Schocken Books books